Yuxarı Ayrım is a ghost village in the Kalbajar District of Azerbaijan. The name reflects the former presence of Ayrums in the vicinity. The main core of the village crowned a knoll above the river Ayrim close to the tree line on a narrow, unpaved track leading up from Aşağı Ayrım. A video released in December 2020 shows the dilapidated state of the stone houses which remained uninhabited after the village's occupation by Armenian forces in 1993.

References 

Populated places in Kalbajar District